Harshnath Temple (Sanskrit: हर्षनाथ् Harṣanātha) is an ancient Hindu temple dedicated to Lord Shiva which is situated in the Sikar district of the Indian state of Rajasthan. It is located 14 km from district headquarters Sikar.

History
This Shiva temple, according to an inscription dated 973 CE, was built by the Shiv ascetic Bhavarakta, during the reign of Chahamana king Vigraharaja I. It is surrounded by various shrines which lie in ruins.

The original temple was later destroyed by Mughal emperor Aurangzeb in 1679. In 1718 Rao Shivsingh constructed a new temple adjacent to the old temple using the ruins of the old temple.

Exactly same type of temple also situated at Harsh Village, Bilara Harsh Deval Temple, Dist Jodhpur, Rajasthan. Harsh Deval Temple at Bilara was also built in 10th century.

Architecture
The temple and its surrounding shrines are now in ruins. The main temple faces east. Its pillars are intricately carved. On the inside west wall is carved a figure of standing Parvati [labelled Vikata] in panchagnitap along with her female attendants.

See also 
 Harshat Mata Temple constructed during the Chahamana period

References

External links 
 

Hindu temples in Rajasthan
Tourist attractions in Sikar district
10th-century Hindu temples
Shiva temples in Rajasthan